The Uttar Pradesh State Board of High School and Intermediate Education (Hindi: उत्तर प्रदेश राज्य हाइ स्कूल और इंटरमीडिएट शिक्षा बोर्ड) is the Uttar Pradesh state government administered autonomous examining authority for the Standard 10 examination (or secondary school level examination) and Standard 12 examination (or inter college level examination) of Uttar Pradesh, headquartered in Prayagraj, India. Presently this board enjoys the tag of Asia's largest board in terms of no. of students. The examination for the 10th and 12th standard is called the High school examination and Intermediate examination respectively.
The High school and Intermediate examinations are conducted annually and simultaneously all over the state of Uttar Pradesh. 
The Board holds the examinations and prepares the results of nearly 61,00,000 students.
Classes are mainly starts from 9th standard in UP Board

History
The Board was set up in 1921 at Allahabad by an act of United Provinces Legislative Council. It conducted its first examination in 1923. This Board is one in India which, from the very start, had adopted 10+2 system of examination. The first public examination after 10 years education is High School Examination and after the 10+2 stage, there is Intermediate Examination. Prior to 1923, University of Allahabad was the examining body of these two examinations.

References

External links 
Official website

School qualifications of India
School examinations in India
Uttar
Education in Uttar Pradesh
1921 establishments in India
Government agencies established in 1921
State agencies of Uttar Pradesh
Intermediate colleges in Uttar Pradesh